Anigozanthos kalbarriensis, commonly known as Kalbarri catspaw, is a grass-like perennial herb native to the south western coastal parts of Western Australia.

Description

Distribution
It is found in a small area on the west coast of Western Australia in the Mid West region from around Kalbarri and Northampton  where it is commonly situated in damp or areas that are wet in winter growing in a variety of soils.

References 

kalbarriensis
Plants described in 1978
Angiosperms of Western Australia
Taxa named by Stephen Hopper
Endemic flora of Southwest Australia